The Myanmar national under-17 football team is the under-17 football team that represents Myanmar at the international football competitions. It is controlled by the Myanmar Football Federation.

International records

FIFA U-17 World Cup

AFC U-17 Asian Cup

AFF U-16 Youth Championship

Players

Current squad
The following players were called up to the 2023 AFC U-17 Asian Cup qualification matches.

Current coaching staff

Source:Myanmar Football Federation

Recent results and forthcoming fixtures

2018

2019

Honours

 AFF U-16 Youth Championship
  Winners (2): 2002, 2005
  Runners-up (2): 2006, 2015
  Third Place (1): 2011

References

External links
 Myanmar Football Federation Official Website
 Soccer Myanmar
 Myanmar Football Federation Facebook Page

U
Asian national under-17 association football teams